Olena Yevhenivna Kopanchuk (born 1 November 1978) is a Ukrainian politician currently serving as a People's Deputy of Ukraine from Ukraine's 189th electoral district as a member of Servant of the People since 29 August 2019. She is also chairman of the Verkhovna Rada Budget Committee.

Biography 
Kopanchuk was the candidate of Servant of the People in Ukraine's 189th electoral district during the 2019 Ukrainian parliamentary election. She was successfully elected.

Co-chair of the group for interparliamentary relations with the Principality of Monaco.

Kopanchuk has been criticised by the anti-corruption non-governmental organisation Chesno for gross violations of the rules of procedure of the Verkhovna Rada and the Constitution of Ukraine, such as an instance of piano voting in stead of Viacheslav Rublyov during the vote on the bill amending the law "On building codes". In connection with the violation of the regulations, as a punishment she promised to give her monthly salary to charitable foundations.

References 

1978 births
Living people
Ninth convocation members of the Verkhovna Rada
21st-century Ukrainian politicians
21st-century Ukrainian women politicians
Lawyers from Lviv
Politicians from Lviv
Servant of the People (political party) politicians
Ukrainian women lawyers
Women members of the Verkhovna Rada